The Battle of Catraeth was fought around AD 600 between a force raised by the Gododdin, a Brythonic people of the Hen Ogledd or "Old North" of Britain, and the Angles of Bernicia and Deira. It was evidently an assault by the Gododdin party on the Angle stronghold of Catraeth, perhaps Catterick, North Yorkshire. The Gododdin force was said to have consisted of warriors from all over the Hen Ogledd, and even some from as far afield as Gwynedd in North Wales and Pictland. The battle was disastrous for the Britons, who were nearly all killed. The slain warriors were commemorated in the important early poem Y Gododdin, attributed to Aneirin.

Battle
In his Canu Aneirin Ifor Williams interpreted mynydawc mwynvawr in the text of Y Gododdin to refer to a person, Mynyddog Mwynfawr in modern Welsh. Mynyddog, in Williams' reading, was the king of the Gododdin, with his chief seat at Din Eidyn (modern Edinburgh). Around the year 600 Mynyddog gathered about 300 selected warriors from across the Brythonic world. He feasted them at Din Eidyn for a year, preparing for battle, then launched an attack on Catraeth, which Williams agrees with Thomas Stephens in identifying as Catterick in North Yorkshire, which was in Anglo-Saxon hands. They were opposed by a larger army from the Anglo-Saxon kingdoms of Deira and Bernicia.

In early historical times, this part of northern England and southern Scotland was the territory of the Votadini, the ancestors of the later Gododdin. By 600 the Angles had formed the important kingdoms of Deira and Bernicia, which were possibly originally ruled by Britons. As such the Battle of Catraeth may have been an attempt to push back Anglo-Saxon expansion. At some time after the battle, the Angles absorbed the Gododdin kingdom and incorporated its territory into the kingdom of Northumbria.

This interpretation has been accepted by most modern scholars. Kenneth H. Jackson accepts the interpretation but suggests that a force of 300 men would be much too small to undertake the task demanded of them. He considers that the 300 mounted warriors would have been accompanied by a larger number of foot soldiers, not considered worthy of mention in the poem. A. O. H. Jarman also follows Williams' interpretation.

Historical fiction
The Battle of Catraeth has appeared in some modern works of fiction. John James used Y Gododdin as the basis for his novel Men went to Cattraeth, originally published 1969. Rosemary Sutcliff's  young adult novel The Shining Company (1990) tells the story of the Battle of Catraeth from the viewpoint of Prosper, shield-bearer to one of King Mynyddog's Gododdin warriors. Richard J Denning's 2010 novel, The Amber Treasure tells the story of the Battle of Catraeth from the point of view of a young Anglo Saxon youth, Cerdic. In Nicola Griffith's novel Hild (2014), one of the main characters, Cian, frequently refers to the epic, as the heroes are aspirational figures to him.

See also 
 Battle of Raith

Notes

References
 Jackson, Kenneth H. 1969. The Gododdin: The Oldest Scottish poem. Edinburgh: Edinburgh University Press.   
 Jarman, A. O. H. (ed.) 1988. Y Gododdin. Britain's Oldest Heroic Poem. The Welsh Classics vol. 3. Gomer. 
 Williams, Ifor. 1938. Canu Aneirin: gyda rhagymadrodd a nodiadau. Aberystwyth: Gwasg Prifysgol Cymru.
 Davies, John. "Dinas Powys, Catraeth, and Llantwit Major." A History of Wales. London: Allen Lane :, 1993. 61-62. Print.

600
600s conflicts
Catraeth
Catraeth
Catraeth
Military history of North Yorkshire
7th century in England
Hen Ogledd
Catterick, North Yorkshire